Block is an Australian term for a small agricultural landholding. Block settlement has been used by Governments to encourage decentralization and during financial depressions to give families of unemployed workers an opportunity (frequently illusory) to become primary producers. It may also refer to a lifestyle choice or "hobby farm" for those with an independent source of income.

Some eventually prospered, but those on marginal land were doomed to failure. Proponents of the "block system" included George Witherage Cotton. Holders of such allotments were referred to as "blockers" or "blockies".

See also
Village Settlements (South Australia)
Soldier settlement (Australia)

References 

1890s in Australia
Australian English
Settlement schemes in Australia